Marja-Liisa Kiljunen is a Finnish diplomat. She has been Finnish Ambassador to Lithuania and Belarus from 2008 to 2012.

Prior to that, she served as a circulating ambassador from Helsinki in 2004 to Kazakhstan, Kyrgyzstan, Tajikistan, Turkmenistan and Uzbekistan, and from 2004 to 2005 to Mongolia. She has served as in the Ministry for Foreign Affairs since 1983.

Kiljunen has worked in Finland at the Ministry for Foreign Affairs Development Cooperation Department and East Department and has served in the Finnish Embassy in Nairobi.Kiljunen has also worked at the University of Helsinki, at the UN University's Wider-Institute and at the headquarters of UNICEF in New York and at the Finnish UN Association and at the Social Democratic Party's Women organization as secretary.

References 

Year of birth missing (living people)
Living people
Ambassadors of Finland to Lithuania
Ambassadors of Finland to Belarus
Ambassadors of Finland to Kazakhstan
Ambassadors of Finland to Kyrgyzstan
Ambassadors of Finland to Tajikistan
Ambassadors of Finland to Uzbekistan
Ambassadors of Finland to Turkmenistan
Ambassadors of Finland to Mongolia
Social Democratic Party of Finland politicians
Finnish women ambassadors